Justice Murray may refer to:

Edward P. Murray, associate justice of the Maine Supreme Judicial Court
Sir George John Robert Murray (1863–1942), of South Australia
Hugh Murray (judge), chief justice of the Supreme Court of California
James Murray (Maryland judge), associate justice of the Maryland Court of Appeals
John L. Murray (judge), chief justice of the Supreme Court of Ireland